Camellia hongkongensis, the Hong Kong camellia, is a species of camellia.

Description
Camellia hongkongensis is a small evergreen tree which can grow to  feet tall. Of the camellia species native to Hong Kong, only this species bears red flowers.

Its young branches are reddish brown. The leaves are leathery and oblong with 7–13 cm long. The young branches and leaf are glabrous.

Distribution
In Hong Kong, three individuals of the species were first discovered in a ravine in Victoria Peak by Colonel Eyre in 1849. It was later found in Pok Fu Lam, Mount Nicholson, Mount Parker on Hong Kong Island. It is also found in Guangdong.

Specimens of the Hong Kong camellia are living in the Shing Mun Arboretum public gardens. In Hong Kong, it is a protected species under Forestry Regulations Cap. 96A.

Camellia hongkongensis was introduced to Japan in 1958 from Hong Kong Zoological and Botanical Gardens.

See also 

 Grantham's camellia

References

hongkongensis
Flora of Hong Kong
Trees of China
Endemic flora of China
Garden plants of Asia
Endangered plants
Plants described in 1859